Russell McVeagh is a New Zealand law firm with offices in Auckland and Wellington. Along with Bell Gully and Chapman Tripp, it is considered to be one of the "Big Three" law firms in New Zealand.

History

John Benjamin Russell (1834–1894) established a one-man practice in Auckland in 1863. Various partners joined him before he was succeeded at the firm by his son Edward Robert Nolan Russell (1869–1939) in 1893.

In 1904 Robert McVeagh became a partner and remained involved in the firm until his death in 1944. In 1969 the firm merged with McKenzie & Bartleet to become Russell McVeagh McKenzie Bartleet & Co, the name it held until 2000, when it became known simply as "Russell McVeagh".

The first legal job of the future politician Winston Peters after graduating in law in 1974 was with Russell McVeagh; he stayed until 1978 before leaving to become a politician.

In 1988 the firm established its Wellington office with four founding partners. It is on the panel of lawyers who are instructed by the New Zealand government to undertake legal work.

It was reported on 14 October 2021 that Russell McVeagh intends to require all staff, clients, and visitors to be fully vaccinated against COVID-19. Chief executive Jo Avenell said that many people are concerned about contacting unvaccinated people and that from 1 November 2021 all visitors must have received both vaccinations.

Notable alumni 

Prior to his current status as the President of the Court of Appeal, Justice Stephen Kos was a litigation partner at Russell McVeagh, and was Chair of the Partnership from 2003–2005. He was  later appointed as a Judge in the Wellington High Court in 2011 before being elevated to the Court of Appeal in 2015 and becoming the President of the Court of Appeal in 2016. 

Court of Appeal Judge Lynton Stevens was a partner of Russell McVeagh McKenzie Bartlett & Co between 1980 and 1992. He was later appointed as a Queens Counsel in 1997 before becoming a High Court Judge in 2006 and being elevated to the Court of Appeal in 2010.

High Court Judges Gerard Van Boheman, Christian Whata, Sarah Katz, Rebecca Edwards and Sally Fitzgerald all previously held roles at Russell McVeagh.

In addition to many judges, Russell McVeagh has also previously employed Tom Ashley, an Olympic Gold medallist in windsurfing, and netballer Charlotte Kight.

Community support 
Russell McVeagh supports a range of different charities and organisations through its pro bono work. Recently, Russell McVeagh has assisted RainbowYOUTH on its merger with OuterSpaces.

Rankings 
Russell McVeagh is considered one of New Zealand's leading law firms, and has achieved high rankings in Banking and Finance, Competition and Antitrust, Corporate and M&A, Capital Markets, Dispute Resolution, Project Development, Real Estate, Restructuring and Insolvency, Tax, and Technology, Media and Telecommunications (TMT).

Controversy 
In 2018 the firm was criticised in the media for its handling of sexual assault allegations, levelled against two senior male lawyers. It was alleged that those lawyers engaged in non-consensual and consensual sexual acts with female intern students. These allegations led all the six university law schools in New Zealand to cut ties with Russell McVeagh.

In 2018, the firm ordered an external investigation into the allegations of sexual assault and harassment. Dame Margaret Bazley was engaged to lead the inquiry into the claims of sexual harassment and assault. Bazley's report was published in July 2018. She found that the firm had a "work hard, play hard" culture that involved excessive drinking and in some cases inappropriate behaviour, but that this culture had changed over the past couple of years. She also found failings in the firm's response to the incidents and made 48 recommendations for improvement, which were accepted by the firm. The president of the New Zealand Law Society, Kathryn Beck, said the report was an "important milestone in shining light into the dark corners of our profession" and that she hoped it would help improve the culture of New Zealand law firms. As of May 2019, the New Zealand law schools were re-evaluating whether they could resume a recruitment relationship with the firm.

In February 2020, the firm said it had addressed the "majority" of Bazley's recommendations, including introducing a whistleblower service and a "speak-up" policy, but did not specifically comment on whether it had introduced a 10-year change implementation plan, a sexual harassment and sexual assault policy or a bullying policy. Steph Dyhrberg, convenor of the Wellington Women Lawyers' Association, said she was disappointed by the response.

In December 2020, CEO Jo Avenell said the firm had taken steps to address the issue of junior lawyers working long hours including by ensuring that workloads were better spread around the firm. In February 2021, the firm said it had addressed nearly 95% of Bazley's recommendations, including introducing a whistleblower service and a "speak-up" policy, but some remained as works-in-progress.

References

External links
Russell McVeagh website

Law firms of New Zealand
Law firms established in 1863
New Zealand companies established in 1863